Bryan Sheehan (born 25 August 1985) is an Irish Gaelic footballer with the St Mary's club in Cahirciveen, South Kerry divisional side and, formerly, the Kerry county team. He won five All-Ireland SFC medals (2004, 2006, 2007, 2009, 2014).

Career

Club

At club level Sheehan lined out with both St Mary's Cahersiveen and South Kerry. Enjoying much success with both. 

His first major success with St. Mary's was winning a Kerry County Football League - Division 1 title in 2003. He would have to wait until 2010 before he got his next success at county level as the club won the Kerry Junior Football Championship. He later added a Munster Junior Club Football Championship after a win over Limerick side Bruree in the final. He later lined out in Croke Park in the All-Ireland Junior Club Football Championship final. He picked up a winners medal after a win over Cavan side Swanlinbar on a 3-13 to 1-05 scoreline.

He was part of the Kerry squad for the 2001 to 2003 All-Ireland Minor Football Championships, winning the Munster Minor Football Championship on all 3 occasions. He played in goal for 2 of those wins in 2001 and 2002, captaining the 2002 team. He played as a forward in the 2003 win. He played with the Kerry team in the 2003 and 2004 All-Ireland Under-21 Football Championships. His first National Football League game with Kerry seniors came in 2005, and in the same year he made his All-Ireland Senior Football Championship debut against Cork GAA in the Munster Senior Football Championship. He became the 2010 Kerry captain, and also helped the St Mary's  club in Cahirciveen win the County and Munster Junior Championships, and in 2011 added the All-Ireland Junior Club Football Championship.

In November 2017, Sheehan announced his retirement from inter-county football.

References

External links
https://web.archive.org/web/20080229092155/http://www.rte.ie/sport/gaa/championship/2007/0917/kerryvcork.html
https://web.archive.org/web/20101029043326/http://www.kerrygaa.ie/old_website/intercounty/2005/senfoot/final2005/penpics.htm
http://www.independent.ie/sport/gaelic-football/crozier-calls-foul-as-sheehan-free-seals-it-1304120.html

1985 births
Living people
All Stars Awards winners (football)
Kerry inter-county Gaelic footballers
Quantity surveyors
St Mary's (Kerry) Gaelic footballers
Winners of two All-Ireland medals (Gaelic football)